The 2001–02 FIS Ski Jumping World Cup was the 23rd World Cup season of ski jumping. It began on 23 November 2001 at Puijo in Kuopio, Finland, and finished on 24 March 2002 at Letalnica bratov Gorišek in Planica, Slovenia. The defending World Cup champion from the previous season was Adam Małysz, who won the overall title for a second time. Sven Hannawald placed second, as well as winning the Four Hills Tournament and becoming the first ski jumper in history to win the "grand slam" of all four competitions in the same tournament. Matti Hautamäki finished third and won the Nordic Tournament. The Nations Cup was won by Germany.

Calendar

Individual competitions

Team competitions

Final standings

Overall

Fours Hills Tournament

Nordic Tournament

Prize money

Nations Cup

Medal table

References

External links

World cup
World cup
FIS Ski Jumping World Cup